Estudio en forma de minueto, sometimes incorrectly named Estudio en forma de minuetto, is an etude for guitar by Spanish guitarist Francisco Tárrega.

Composition and analysis 

Francisco Tárrega produced a large number of compositions and arrangements for solo guitar as pieces to be performed only for personal purposes. This etude was finished while living in Barcelona on September 29, 1906. It was dedicated to Consuelo Pascual de Bordum and was later published by Vidal Llimona y Boceta. The whole piece, which consists of only one major section, is in A major. Given that Tárrega's compositions were personal divertimentos at the time, it has been published many times over in different collections and has been given different catalogue numbers. However, no definitive cataloging system has been established for any of Tárrega's compositions.

Notable recordings 

The following is a list of notable performances of this composition:

See also
List of compositions by Francisco Tárrega

References

External links 
 

1906 compositions
Compositions by Francisco Tárrega